MIGS could mean:

 Main Industrial Groupings
 Mastercard Internet Gateway Service
 Metal-induced gap states
 Minimally invasive glaucoma surgery
 Montreal International Games Summit